"Good as Hell" is a song recorded by the American singer and rapper Lizzo. Written by Lizzo and producer Ricky Reed, it was released on March 8, 2016, by Atlantic Records and Nice Life Recording Company as the lead single from her first extended play, Coconut Oil, and subsequently was the namesake for her 2017 Good as Hell Tour. It was re-released in 2019 as a radio single, when it became a sleeper hit like her first hit, "Truth Hurts".

Following her performance of "Good as Hell" at the 2019 MTV Video Music Awards, it entered the US Billboard Hot 100, later reaching number three in November 2019 and the top ten in several other countries, including Australia, Canada, Belgium, New Zealand and the UK. Two music videos were released for the song; the first was set in a hair salon in 2016, and the second sees her playing in the marching band at Southern University for homecoming week in 2019. The single has received a 5× Platinum certification by the Recording Industry Association of America (RIAA).

Release
"Good as Hell" was originally recorded for the soundtrack of the 2016 film Barbershop: The Next Cut. It first made its premiere on Zane Lowe's Beats 1 Radio show.

The song was released to digital retailers and streaming platforms on March 8, 2016. A four-track dance remix EP was released on June 17, 2016.

An official remix featuring American singer Ariana Grande was released on October 25, 2019.

Music videos
The first music video was released on May 11, 2016. It shows Lizzo and several women of color going to a hair salon, having their hair and nails done while having fun with the occasion. The music video also ties into the movie Barbershop: The Next Cut.

On December 9, 2019, in the wake of the song's growing popularity, a new "official music video" was premiered on YouTube. This music video, directed by Alan Ferguson, is set in Southern University and features the Baton Rouge HBCU. In it, the university's marching band students have trouble with some regular classes in between preparation for an upcoming performance, with one of the university's marching band dancers looking heartbroken over a prior relationship she had with another student. Lizzo then shows up during one of the rehearsals and appears with the group throughout the video, performing her song and having fun with the group throughout the video.

Critical reception
In a review for NPR, Hanif Abdurraqib praised the song's inspirational and motivational qualities, saying "[the song is] the anthem of both the night itself and of life in preparation for it: the saint that comes to you in the mirror when the lighting is bad, or the hair won't move the way you want it to, or when you've tried on all of the outfits and none of them seem right." Abdurraqib also called it "the rare song that can play at any point in a night out and resonate in each."

In 2019, Billboard included "Good as Hell" on their list of the Top 10 Lizzo songs, saying "the song's message of self-love mixed with a melody that will worm its way inside your head make this track an absolute stunner."

Chart performance
While "Good as Hell" never charted during Coconut Oils release period, it began to gain traction in 2019 following Lizzo's continuing career trajectory and the chart climb of her 2017 hit "Truth Hurts". Following Lizzo's performance of the song at the 2019 MTV Video Music Awards, it entered the Billboard Hot 100 the following week at number 52, later peaking at number three, becoming Lizzo's second top 10 hit on the chart.

The club mixes of "Good as Hell" gave Lizzo her first number one at Dance Club Songs and her second chart topper at Dance/Mix Show Airplay in December 2019.

Following the release of the remix featuring Ariana Grande, "Good as Hell" reached new top 10 peaks in the United Kingdom,  New Zealand, and Australia, becoming Lizzo's first top 10 single in each of these countries.

Live performances

Lizzo performed a medley of "Truth Hurts" and "Good as Hell" at the 2019 MTV Video Music Awards. Wearing a neon yellow leotard, she transitioned into "Good As Hell" after opening with "Truth Hurts", with digital clouds in the background. During the performance, Lizzo took a shot of tequila and gave a self-acceptance speech. In Rolling Stone, Angie Martoccio opined that she "[took] the crowd to church" with a set that "[resembled] a hip-hop heaven". In NPR Music, Stephen Thompson opined that the performance "was a huge standout for the night—a win that'll do a lot more for her staying power than some statuette".

Lizzo performed "Good as Hell" on December 21, 2019, on Saturday Night Live. Accompanied by dancers, the Christmas-themed performance included trees, fake snow and candy-cane-painted stripper poles. She also performed a medley of "Cuz I Love You", "Truth Hurts", "Good as Hell" and "Juice" at the 2020 Brit Awards.

In other media
"Good as Hell" has been used in the films Barbershop: The Next Cut, A Bad Moms Christmas, I Feel Pretty, Blockers and Brittany Runs a Marathon, as well as successive adverts for JD Williams, Garnier and My Little Pony: Pony Life. It was also used in Season 10 of the television show RuPaul's Drag Race in "lip sync for your life" between Kameron Michaels and Monét X Change. Lizzo herself was a guest judge in the episode. The song was also in the 2020 music video game Fuser.

Awards and nominations
{| class="wikitable sortable plainrowheaders" style="width: 60%;"
|-
! scope="col" | Year
! scope="col" | Ceremony
! scope="col" | Category
! scope="col" | Result
! scope="col" class="unsortable"| 
|-
| rowspan=4| 2020
| MTV Video Music Awards
| Best Editing
| 
| style="text-align:center;"|
|-
| Billboard Music Awards
| Top R&B Song
| 
| style="text-align:center;"|
|-
| BMI R&B/Hip-Hop Awards
| Award-Winning Songs
| 
| style="text-align:center;"|
|-
| Soul Train Music Awards
| Video of the Year
| 
| style="text-align:center;"|

Track listing
Digital download
 "Good as Hell" – 2:39

Spotify version
 "Good as Hell" – 2:39
 "Truth Hurts" – 2:53

Digital Remix EP
 "Good as Hell" (Bad Royale Remix) – 3:33
 "Good as Hell" (Nick Catchdubs Remix) – 3:56
 "Good as Hell" (BNDR Remix) – 3:43
 "Good as Hell" (Two Stacks Remix) – 2:57

Charts

Weekly charts

Year-end charts

Certifications

Ariana Grande remix

A remix of the song with fellow American singer Ariana Grande was released on October 25, 2019.

Track listing
Digital download
 "Good as Hell" (with Ariana Grande) [Remix] – 2:39

Streaming
 "Good as Hell" (with Ariana Grande) - Remix – 2:39
 "Good as Hell" – 2:39

Accolades

Charts

Release history

References

External links

2016 singles
2016 songs
2019 singles
Atlantic Records singles
Lizzo songs
Ariana Grande songs
Barbershop (franchise)
Songs written by Ricky Reed
Songs written by Lizzo
Songs written for films
Music videos directed by Alan Ferguson (director)
American contemporary R&B songs